Renanthera monachica is a species of orchid endemic to the Philippines. It has a yellow base and red spots.

References 

monachica
Orchids of the Philippines
Endemic orchids of the Philippines